The Birches may refer to:

 The Birches, County Armagh, a settlement in Northern Ireland
 The Birches (Belgrade Lakes, Maine), a house listed on the U.S. National Register of Historic Places (NRHP)
 The Birches (Garrison, New York), aka The Birches Philipstown, New York, a house designed by Ralph Adams Cram and listed on the NRHP

See also
 Birch (disambiguation)